= Bokariadi =

Coordinates: 09°55′00″N 12°12′00″W

Bokariadi is one of a number of towns in Guinea with this name. This is the one in the south east of the country near the border with Sierra Leone.

== Elevation ==
- Elevation = 144m
- Elevation2 = 165.76m
